Vasilitsa is a ski resort in Greece. The ski center is located in the middle of Pindos (40.033N, 21.083E), approximately 42km away from Grevena and 417km from Athens. The ski resorts currently has five lifts and 16 ski trails. The summit of the resort is 2113m above sea level and the total vertical drop about 450m. The quality and quantity of snowfall at Vasilitsa allow for many off-piste routes. Black-pine trees surround the ski trails.

Lifts and ski trails 
 Philippos (1642-1825m), with two intermediate-easy trails and one very easy trail.
 Alexander the Great (1800–2113m), with two hard and two intermediate trails.
 Elimeia (1788–2060m), with one intermediate, three intermediate-easy and one very easy trail.
 Midganis (1810–2034m), with one intermediate trail.
 Tymfaia (1744–2040m), with two hard-intermediate trails and one intermediate trail.
 Two Baby lifts
Two of the trails have been homologated by FIS as Olympic trails.

History 
The first lift was built in 1975 (Elimeia). The ski resort has since had two major expansions, one in 1993 and the second in 2000.

See also 
 Vasilica (disambiguation)

External links 

 Vasilitsa website (Greek)
 Snowguide.gr
 Weather forecast

Tourist attractions in Western Macedonia
Ski areas and resorts in Greece
Pindus
Mountains of Western Macedonia
Natura 2000 in Greece